Central is a town in Pickens County, South Carolina, United States. As of the 2010 census, the population was 5,159, roughly 3,000 of whom were considered permanent residents. Contrary to its name, it is not near South Carolina's center. It received its name from being halfway or the central point between Atlanta and Charlotte along the former Atlanta and Richmond Air-Line Railway line. Southern Wesleyan University's main campus is east of downtown Central.

History
Central was founded by the Atlanta and Richmond Air Line Railway in a railroad boom that began in 1873. The town's name represents the fact that it is midway between Atlanta and Charlotte. Central was incorporated as a town on March 17, 1875.

In 1897, Southern Railway moved its headquarters from Central to Greenville; trains no longer stopped to change engines, and soon all shops and offices were closed. The establishment of Issaqueena Mill and, in 1906, Wesleyan Methodist Bible Institute (now Southern Wesleyan University) brought people back to the town.

Two buildings on Church Street in Central are listed on the National Register of Historic Places: Central High School and Morgan House. The Central Roller Mills on Madden Bridge Road was listed in 2013.

Geography

Downtown Central is bisected by a rail line. A significant number of late 19th- to early 20th-century commercial buildings remain, most of which are single-story and retain a good amount of historical integrity. As of 2006, a downtown streetscape project is underway that is designed to improve the area's aesthetics. There are also many modest pre-World War II homes near the downtown. Central has several large apartment complexes, including The Reserve, which primarily house students from nearby Clemson University (who can use Clemson Area Transit to get there), as well as from Southern Wesleyan University.

The Central Heritage Society has a museum and information on many historic buildings and homes in the area.

Attractions 
In addition to Southern Wesleyan University, the town is home to Grand Central Station, a disc golf course that hosts Professional Disc Golf Association (PDGA) tournaments.

Demographics

Central is part of the Greenville–Mauldin–Easley metropolitan area.

2000 census
As of the census of 2000, there were 3,522 people, 1,560 households, and 617 families residing in the town. The population density was 1,463.4 people per square mile (564.3/km2). There were 1,832 housing units at an average density of 761.2 per square mile (293.5/km2). The racial makeup of the town was 79.70% White, 15.25% African American, 1.79% Asian, 0.03% Native American, 2.13% from other races, and 1.11% from two or more races. Hispanic or Latino of any race were 4.32% of the population.

There were 1,560 households, of which 17.2% had children under the age of 18 living with them, 27.1% were married couples living together, 8.9% had a female householder with no husband present, and 60.4% were non-families. 35.1% of all households were made up of individuals, and 7.2% had someone living alone who was 65 years of age or older. The average household size was 2.19 and the average family size was 2.91.

In the town, the population was spread out, with 15.1% under the age of 18, 37.4% from 18 to 24, 25.7% from 25 to 44, 12.7% from 45 to 64, and 9.2% who were 65 years of age or older. The median age was 24. For every 100 females, there were 116.3 males. For every 100 females age 18 and over, there were 115.5 males.

The median income for a household in the town was $23,869, and the median income for a family was $39,524. Males had a median income of $26,855 versus $22,207 for females. The per capita income for the town was $14,394. About 11.3% of families and 29.2% of the population were below the poverty line, including 19.0% of those under age 18 and 8.2% of those age 65 or over.

2010 census
Central's population has grown rapidly since 2000, mostly due to the construction of apartment complexes for students attending Clemson University, Southern Wesleyan and Tri-County Technical College.

2020 census

As of the 2020 United States census, there were 5,247 people, 2,483 households, and 796 families residing in the town.

Education
Public education is provided by the School District of Pickens County (Pickens 01), including D. W. Daniel High School, a 2005 National Blue Ribbon School.

The Central Clemson Regional Branch library, part of the Pickens County Library System, serves as the community's public library.

Central shares educational facilities and transportation services with the adjacent city of Clemson.

Southern Wesleyan University
Central is home to Southern Wesleyan University's main campus. Southern Wesleyan University is a SACS-accredited four-year Christian university founded in 1906. The main campus houses over 600 traditional undergraduate students. It has three main housing buildings, two fine arts centers, a dining hall, a library, a gym, and many class buildings. The campus is also home to FWC Alive, a Wesleyan church that offers a traditional worship service and a contemporary worship service.

Library
Central has a public library, a branch of the Pickens County Library System.

Town government 
The town has a council form of government, with six elected council members and a mayor serving as the presiding officer. Members of council are elected to four-year terms. Day-to-day operations are governed by a town administrator.

Notable people 

 Lindsey Graham, senior United States senator from South Carolina, born and raised in Central
 DeAndre Hopkins, wide receiver for the Arizona Cardinals, born and raised in Central
 Jarvis Jenkins, former NFL defensive lineman, born and raised in Central
 Shaq Lawson, NFL defensive end for the Buffalo Bills
 DeShawn Williams, NFL defensive lineman for the Denver Broncos
 Furman L. Smith, Medal of Honor recipient, who as part of the 34th Infantry Division fought and died during World War II, is buried in Central.
 Timothy L. Smith, noted historian and educator, born in Central

References

External links
 City of Central
 Central Historic Marker from hmdb.org

 
Towns in Pickens County, South Carolina
Towns in South Carolina
Upstate South Carolina
Populated places established in 1875
1875 establishments in South Carolina